Ingeborg De Meulemeester (born 14 April 1965, in Kortrijk) is a Belgian politician and is affiliated to the N-VA. She was elected as a member of the Belgian Chamber of Representatives in 2010.

Notes

1965 births
Living people
People from Kortrijk
New Flemish Alliance politicians
Members of the Chamber of Representatives (Belgium)
21st-century Belgian politicians
21st-century Belgian women politicians